SS Don was a freight vessel built for the Goole Steam Shipping Company Limited in 1892.

History

She was built by William Dobson and Company in Walker Yard for the Goole Steam Shipping Company Limited and launched on 11 July 1892.

She was obtained by the Lancashire and Yorkshire Railway in 1905.

Her crew survived.

References

1892 ships
Steamships of the United Kingdom
Ships built on the River Tyne
Ships of the Lancashire and Yorkshire Railway
Maritime incidents in 1915
Ships sunk by German submarines in World War I
World War I shipwrecks in the North Sea